A Master of Mathematics (or MMath) degree is a specific advanced integrated Master's degree for courses in the field of mathematics.

United Kingdom
In the United Kingdom, the MMath is the internationally recognized standard qualification after a four-year course in mathematics at a university.
The MMath programme was set up by most leading universities after the Neumann Report in 1992. It is classed as a level 7 qualification in the Frameworks of Higher Education Qualifications of UK Degree-Awarding Bodies. The UCAS course codes for the MMath degrees start at G100 upwards, most courses taking the codes G101 - G104.

Universities which offer MMath degrees include:

Aberystwyth University
University of Bath
University of Bristol (MSci)
Brunel University
University of Birmingham (MSci)
Cardiff University
University of Cambridge
City University London
University of Central Lancashire
University of Dundee
University of Durham
University of East Anglia
University of Edinburgh
University of Essex
University of Exeter
University of Glasgow
Heriot-Watt University
University of Hull
University of Keele
University of Kent
Lancaster University
University of Leeds
University of Leicester
University of Lincoln
University of Liverpool
Liverpool Hope University
Loughborough University
University of Manchester
Manchester Metropolitan University
Middlesex University (from 2014)
Newcastle University
Northumbria University
University of Nottingham
Nottingham Trent University
Open University (until 2007)
Oxford Brookes University
University of Oxford
University of Plymouth
University of Portsmouth
University of Reading
University of St Andrews
University of Sheffield
University of Southampton
University of Strathclyde
University of Surrey
University of Sussex
Swansea University
University of Warwick
University of York

Notes

Canada
In Canada, the MMath is a graduate degree offered by the University of Waterloo. The length of the MMath degree program is typically between one and two years, and consists of course work along with a research component. The first Waterloo MMath degrees were awarded in 1967.  MMath is the master's degree offered by David R. Cheriton School of Computer Science, since it is within the Faculty of Mathematics at Waterloo.

India
In India, the M. Math. is a graduate degree offered by the Indian Statistical Institute. The course consists of two years and is done in the Bangalore and Kolkata centres in alternating years. The participants are selected through two screening(one objective and other subjective) tests along with an interview and it is arguably the best graduate course in mathematics offered in India.

See also
Bachelor of Mathematics
British degree abbreviations
Bachelor's degrees
Master's degrees

References

Mathematics
Mathematics education